Sandhwan is a village in Faridkot district of Punjab, India. It is 4 km from Kotkapura, towards Faridkot. Giani Zail Singh, 7th President of India hailed from Sandhwan.

The nearest railway station is Giani Zial Singh Sandhwan Railway Station (0.2 km), the nearest bus stand is Kotkapura Bus Station (4.3 km), and the nearest airport is Bathinda Airport (55.9 km})

Villages in Shaheed Bhagat Singh Nagar district